Nepalese in South Korea comprise Korean Citizens and Nepalese migrant workers, including temporary expatriates and permanent residents, as well as their locally born descendants of either Korean or Nepalese nationality. The Nepalese in South Korea are mainly of four distinct ethnic groups : Bahun (Brahmins), Chhetri (Rajputs), Madhesis and Janjatis.

Migration history
The first wave of Nepalese immigration began in the late 1980s. After Nepal restored its democracy in the 1990s, labour laws were changed to allow  Nepalese youths to go abroad in search of work. The Nepalese community in South Korea thus consists primarily of migrant workers, but also has large numbers of students as well as Nepalese women married to South Korean men they met through international matchmaking agencies. The Nepali government are attempting to induce Nepali workers staying illegally in South Korea (roughly 2,500 ) to return home, in hopes that the South Korean government will increase its intake of Nepali workers in future years.

Culture
The Nepalese community managed to keep their traditions alive while living in South Korea. Nepalese festivals such as Tihar, Dasain and Teej are celebrated throughout the country.

Organisations
The Non-Resident Nepali Association of Korea is one organisation for Nepalese people living in South Korea. In 2010, they opened a shelter in Dongdaemun-gu, Seoul to provide charitable assistance for Nepalese who become unemployed or otherwise face difficulties. Another organisation, aimed specifically at international students, is the Society of Nepalese Students in Korea (SONSIK), established in 2004. South Korea's multilingual Migrant Workers' Television was founded by Nepali migrant worker Minod Moktan (Minu), a human rights activist who lived in South Korea for nearly 18 years before being deported in October 2009.

References

External links
Society of Nepalese Students in Korea
Non-Resident Nepalese Association of Korea
Migrant Workers' Television
 Nepalese Migrant Workers in Korea, 2005 M.A. project by Sirjana Gautam Bhattarai, Chonbuk National University

Demographics of South Korea
South Korea
South Korea